John of St. Thomas, O.P., born João Poinsot (also called John Poinsot in English; 9 July 1589 – 15 June 1644), was a Portuguese Dominican friar, Thomist theologian, and professor of philosophy. He is known for being an early theorist in the field of semiotics.

Biography
Of noble parentage, he was sent early to the University of Coimbra, displayed talents of the first order, completed his humanities and philosophy, and obtained the degree of Master of Arts. He then entered the University of Louvain. Here, too, he showed remarkable ability, and won the title of Bachelor of Theology at an early age. He joined the Dominicans at Madrid in 1612 or 1613, taking the name of John of St. Thomas, by which he is known to history. As professor of philosophy and theology at the University of Alcalá, he soon took rank among the most learned men of the time, and was placed successively (1630 and 1640) in charge of the two principal chairs of theology in the university of that city. His renown drew the largest number of scholars that had ever attended its theological faculties.

No man enjoyed a greater reputation in Spain, or was more frequently consulted on points of doctrine and ecclesiastical matters. His theological and philosophical writings, which have gone through many editions, are among the best expositions of Thomas Aquinas's doctrine, of which he is acknowledged to be one of the foremost interpreters. Though he took an active part in the scholastic discussions of his times, his courtesy was such that he is said never to have hurt an opponent's feelings. So faithful was he to the traditions of his order and the principles of the Angelic Doctor that in his last illness he could declare that, in all the thirty years he had devoted to teaching and writing, he had not taught or written anything contrary to St. Thomas. His humility and his devotion to education caused him to refuse many dignities offered him by the Church and his order. In 1643 Philip IV offered him the office of royal confessor, a position which only religious obedience could induce him to accept. His writings comprise: Cursus philosophicus Thomisticus (9 vols.); Cursus Theologici (9 vols.), which is a commentary on the Summa Theologica of St. Thomas; Tractatus de Approbatione, Auctoritate, et Puritate Doctrinae D. Thomae Aquinatis; A Compendium of Christian Doctrine (in Spanish); and A Treatise on a Happy Death (in Spanish), written at the command of Philip IV.  He died at Fraga, Spain.

Works

References

Sources

Further reading

External links
General Bibliography by Marco Forlivesi
The rediscovery of John Poinsot – Annotated bibliography about the contributions of John of St. Thomas to semiotics
Cursus Philosophicus Thomisticus – Latin text by John of St. Thomas

Scholastic philosophers
17th-century philosophers
Semioticians
1589 births
1644 deaths
17th-century Portuguese people
People from Lisbon
Roman Catholic friars
Dominican theologians
Members of the Dominican Order
Portuguese philosophers
Portuguese theologians
University of Coimbra alumni
Academic staff of the University of Alcalá
School of Salamanca